Keith Justin Hetrick is a Grammy-nominated American songwriter and record producer based in Nashville, Tennessee. He has worked with notable artists such as Jennifer Lopez, Boyz II Men, Snoop Dogg, Charlie Wilson, Shaggy, T.I., Pitbull, Now United, Fifth Harmony, GOT7, NCT, Cher Lloyd, Roy Wang, Nine Percent, Wanna One, Aston Merrygold, Silentó, The Jacksons, Ray Parker Jr., Teddy Riley, Paulina Rubio, Sophia Grace, and Inna.

Career
In 2016, Hetrick was nominated for a Grammy Award for his writing and production work on the Charlie Wilson album Forever Charlie, which included the songs "Unforgettable" (featuring Shaggy), "Infectious" (featuring Snoop Dogg), and the opening track "Somebody Loves You." Forever Charlie also gartered a NAACP nomination for “Outstanding Album."

In August 2016, ISINA artist New District released the single "Ain't Got Money," which Hetrick wrote and co-produced alongside industry heavyweight Randy Jackson. In December of that same year, Hetrick wrote and produced three songs on the NAACP-nominated Charlie Wilson album In It To Win It, including the lead single "I'm Blessed" (featuring T.I.), which went to #1 on both the Billboard R&B charts and Hot Gospel charts in early 2017. “I’m Blessed” was nominated for an NAACP Award for “Best Duo or Group,"
as well winning as an ASCAP Rhythm & Soul Award  for most airplay on the R&B and Gospel charts.

Charlie Wilson follow-up single "Good Time" featured Pitbull, Teddy Riley and Ray Parker Jr., to which Hetrick is also responsible for.

Hetrick has also had a string of releases with Korean, Japanese and Chinese artists like Girl's Day, A.O.A., SEEART, and the full Season 2 cast of the hit Korean-based talent show Produce 101. Song releases include the singles "Whatta Man (Good Man)" by I.O.I, "Can't Stop Won't Stop Loving You" by Japanese artist Daichi Miura, the self-titled single "Playback" by South-Korean group Playback, and "So Beautiful" by South-Korean artist Jin Won. Particularly, "It's Me (Pick Me)," a 2017 single by K-pop group Wanna One, was described as "one of the most influential and memorable K-pop songs of 2017". It later went on to become a certified platinum single.

Rounding out his 2017, the Make-a-Wish Foundation used the Madison McWilliams song "Fighter" (which Hetrick co-wrote and produced) for their campaign in the Texas and Southern US regions.

In September 2018, Hetrick partnered up with End Slavery to perform at their annual Voices of Freedom event, in hopes of raising awareness to human trafficking and sex slavery in the state of Tennessee.

In August 2020, Hetrick wrote/produced the song "Feel It Now" (performed by the group Now United), that was used by Pepsi for their #FeelItNow & #ForTheLoveOfIt international campaign. Also, in October of that same year, the Now United song "Come Together" won "Best International Hit" at the Nickelodeon Kids Choice Awards (Meus Prêmios Nick) in Brazil.

The special edition bar reflects Now United's colors with 12 different colored fingers.

Hetrick produced the song On My Way for the 2022 Universal Pictures film Marry Me.

Hetrick has had songs on ABC's  The Today Show, Dancing With The Stars, NBC's  Jimmy Kimmel Live!, CBS's  The Talk, the Netflix series Unplanned America, Lifetime's UnREAL, MTV's Finding Carter, VH1 and BET's Hit The Floor, as well commercials, local TV shows, and airliners all around the world.

Discography

References

1988 births
Living people
People from Huntington Beach, California
People from Orange County, California
Musicians from Orange County, California
21st-century American singers
American pop guitarists
American male guitarists
American pop pianists
American record producers
21st-century American guitarists
21st-century American pianists
21st-century American male singers